Photis is a genus of amphipod crustaceans, containing the following species:

Photis aequimanus Schellenberg, 1925
Photis africana Schellenberg, 1925
Photis aina J. L. Barnard, 1970
Photis albus Budnikova, 1985
Photis angustimanus Ren, 2006
Photis antennata Chevreux, 1926
Photis ariakensis (Hirayama, 1984)
Photis baeckmannae Gurjanova, 1951
Photis beringiensis Tzvetkova, 1980
Photis bifurcata J. L. Barnard, 1962
Photis brevicaudatus (Norman, 1867)
Photis brevipes Shoemaker, 1942
Photis californica Stout, 1913
Photis cavimana Ledoyer, 1979
Photis chiconola J. L. Barnard, 1964
Photis coeca J. L. Barnard, 1962
Photis conchicola Alderman, 1936
Photis davei Myers, 2009
Photis dentata Shoemaker, 1945
Photis dolichommata Stebbing, 1910
Photis elephantis J. L. Barnard, 1962
Photis fischmanni Gurjanova, 1951
Photis goreensis Schellenberg, 1925
Photis hawaiensis J. L. Barnard, 1955
Photis inornatus Myers et al., 2012
Photis japonica Hirayama, 1984
Photis kapapa J. L. Barnard, 1970
Photis kurilica Gurjanova, 1955
Photis lacia J. L. Barnard, 1962
Photis lamellifera Schellenberg, 1928
Photis lamina Hirayama, 1984
Photis linearmanus Conlan, 1994
Photis longicaudata (Bate & Westwood, 1862)
Photis longidactyla Griffiths, 1974
Photis longimana Walker, 1904
Photis longipes (Della Valle, 1893)
Photis macinerneyi Conlan, 1983
Photis macrocarpa Stebbing, 1888
Photis macromana McKinney et al., 1978
Photis macrotica J. L. Barnard, 1962
Photis malinalco J. L. Barnard, 1967
Photis melanica McKinney, 1980
Photis nana (Walker, 1904)
Photis nataliae Bulycheva, 1952
Photis nigricola Lowry, 1979
Photis obesa Chevreux, 1926
Photis oligochaeta Conlan, 1983
Photis pachydactyla Conlan, 1983
Photis paeowai Myers, 1995
Photis parvidons Conlan, 1983
Photis phaeocula Lowry, 1979
Photis pirloti Myers, 1985
Photis pollex Walker, 1895
Photis producta (Stimpson, 1856)
Photis pugnator Shoemaker, 1945
Photis reinhardi Krøyer, 1842
Photis serae Souza-Filho & Serejo, 2010
Photis sinensis Ren, 2006
Photis spasskii Gurjanova, 1951
Photis spinicarpa Shoemaker, 1942
Photis strelkovi Gurjanova, 1953
Photis tenuicornis Sars, 1882
Photis tropherus Thomas & J. L. Barnard, 1991
Photis typhlops Conlan, 1994
Photis uncinata K. H. Barnard, 1932
Photis vinogradovi Gurjanova, 1951
Photis viuda J. L. Barnard, 1962
Photis zhujiangensis Ren, 2006

References

Corophiidea
Crustacean genera
Taxa named by Henrik Nikolai Krøyer